Hebetoxyites is a genus of ammonoid cephalopod from the middle part of the Bajocian stage, middle Jurassic, included in the Strigoceratidae, Haploceratoidea. The shell is oxyconic, with a sharp rim but no keel, and involute, with the inner whorls hidden. The umbilicus is very small. Sides have a spiral ridge but are not striate.

References
Notes

Bibliography
 W.Arkell, et al. Mesozoic Ammonoidea (L271), Treatise on Invertebrate Paleontology, Part L, 1957. Geological Society of America and University of Kansas Press

Middle Jurassic ammonites
Haploceratoidea
Ammonitida genera